The Nash Ensemble of London is an English chamber ensemble. It was founded by Artistic Director Amelia Freedman and Rodney Slatford in 1964, while they were students at the Royal Academy of Music, and was named after the Nash Terraces around the academy. The Ensemble has won awards from the Edinburgh Festival Critics and the Royal Philharmonic Society, as well as a 2002 Gramophone Award for contemporary music.

In addition to their classical repertoire, the Ensemble performs works by numerous contemporary composers, including Richard Rodney Bennett, Harrison Birtwistle, Elliott Carter, Henri Dutilleux, Mark-Anthony Turnage, and Peter Maxwell Davies, and has given premier performances of more than 200 works.

Personnel

Current members 
 Adrian Brendel (cello)
 Clifford Benson (piano)
 Philippa Davies (flute)
 Richard Hosford (clarinet)
 Gareth Hulse (oboe)
 Ursula Leveaux (bassoon)
 Duncan McTier (double bass)
 Lawrence Power (viola)
 Laura Samuel (violin)
 Marianne Thorsen (violin)
 Lucy Wakeford (harp)
 Richard Watkins (horn)

Former members 
 Ian Brown (piano)
 Skaila Kanga (harp)
 Malin Broman (violin)
 Roger Chase (viola)
 Robin Miller (oboe)
 Michael Collins (clarinet)
 Marcia Crayford (violin)
 Mark David (trumpet)
 Catherine Edwards (organ and piano)
 Liz Layton (violin)
 Bryn Lewis (harp)
 Simon Limbrick (percussion)
 Frank Lloyd (horn)
 Judith Pearce (flute)
 John Pigneguy (horn)
 David Purser (trombone and sackbutt)
 Rodney Slatford (double bass)
 Christopher Van Kampen (cello; died 1997)
 Paul Watkins (cello)
 James Watson (trumpet)
 Brian Wightman (bassoon)

References

External links
 Nash Ensemble of London

Chamber music groups
Contemporary classical music ensembles
Chamber orchestras
Musical groups established in 1964
British classical music groups
Gramophone Award winners
1964 establishments in England